William Chaloner may refer to:
William Chaloner (1650s, or 1665–1699), con artist
William Gilbert Chaloner (1928–2016), British paleobotanist
William Chaloner (MP) for Malmesbury (UK Parliament constituency)
Sir William Chaloner, 1st Baronet (1587–1641) of the Chaloner baronets

See also
Chaloner (surname)